"Angel Gabriella" is a song by Nigerian R&B singer Faze, which he wrote and recorded in 2004 in the light of the growing "Faze versus 2Face" beef which lasted till 2006. Angel Gabriella was released as the second single of the album and is also the second of his entire career as an artiste. Angel Gabriella exposed Faze's deeper and inner feelings well blended with properly noted lyrics.

Background and writing
"Angel Gabriella" is an R&B song which runs for five minutes and four seconds. The song depicts Faze addressing his girlfriend as his long lasting and greatly admired angel of his life. The song is constructed in the common verse-chorus form-bridge song pattern. It employs kicks, guitars and piano sounds which are all prominent throughout the song.
The song employs an increasing but yet entertaining bridge vocals from the artiste after much melo laid-back style delivered verses.

Release
"Angel Gabriella" was released to radio stations in 2004 as the second single off his platinum selling album Faze Alone. The single was released through Westside Music Inc. As at early 2005 the single had reached all radio station, getting sizeable rotation on radio stations and eventually TV channels after the shooting of the video in 2005.

Reception and chart performance

"Angel Gabriella" peaked at number 5 on Rhythm FM top 10, number 6 on Ray Power and number 16 on Cosmo FM best songs of the year 2005.

Chart

References
Faze- Faze Alone album 
Album Sales

External links
Mynaijanews 
Naijapals 
Allafrica 

2008 singles
Faze (musician) songs
Songs written by Faze (musician)
2004 songs